Jens Fahrbring (born 20 April 1984) is a Swedish professional golfer and European Tour player. He has won the Norwegian Challenge and the D+D Real Czech Challenge.

Amateur career
Fahrbring played college golf at Virginia Commonwealth University in the United States.

Professional career
Fahrbring turned professional in 2007 and played on the Nordic Golf League from 2007 to 2012. He finished third on the 2012 rankings which earned him his 2013 Challenge Tour card. In August 2013, he won his first Challenge Tour event, the Norwegian Challenge.

In 2015, Fahrbring won the D+D Real Czech Challenge and tied for third at the Kazakhstan Open, to finishing 10th amongst the Challenge Tour graduates. He also finished third at the Open d'Italia, one stroke away from joining the playoff between Rikard Karlberg and Martin Kaymer. On the 2016 European Tour his best finish was 12th in the Portugal Masters, and he went through Q School to regain his card. In 2017 he was fifth at the Porsche European Open, but finished 126th in the season rankings.

Back on the Challenge Tour, Fahrbring lost a playoff at the 2018 Barclays Kenya Open, and in 2020 he was third at the Northern Ireland Open.

Fahrbring came through Q-School again to join the 2023 European Tour, where he was in contention almost immediately at the South African Open. After an opening round of 65 he played in the final group on Sunday and ultimately finished third, two strokes behind the winner Thriston Lawrence.

Professional wins (3)

Challenge Tour wins (2)

Challenge Tour playoff record (0–1)

Nordic Golf League wins (1)

Source:

See also
2015 Challenge Tour graduates
2016 European Tour Qualifying School graduates
2022 European Tour Qualifying School graduates

References

External links

Swedish male golfers
European Tour golfers
VCU Rams men's golfers
Golfers from Stockholm
People from Sollentuna Municipality
1984 births
Living people
21st-century Swedish people